Uropodella is a genus of mites in the family Uropodellidae. There is one described species in Uropodella, U. laciniata.

References

Mesostigmata
Articles created by Qbugbot